Altenia perspersella is a moth of the family Gelechiidae. It is found in Norway, Sweden, Finland, Latvia, Lithuania, Russia and Belarus. It was recently discovered in Canada, with records from Manitoba and Yukon.

The wingspan is 12–15 mm. Adults are on wing from May to July.

The larvae feed on Empetrum nigrum.

References

External links

 Global Biodiversity Information Facility

Moths described in 1862
Altenia
Moths of Asia
Moths of Europe
Moths of North America